Max Wegner (born 24 March 1989) is a German professional footballer who plays as a forward for  club VfB Oldenburg.

Career
In August 2020, Wegner joined Regionalliga Nord side VfB Oldenburg.

References

External links
 
 
 

1989 births
Living people
German footballers
Association football forwards
Hannover 96 II players
SV Wilhelmshaven players
SV Werder Bremen II players
SV Werder Bremen players
FC Erzgebirge Aue players
Sportfreunde Lotte players
SV Meppen players
Rot-Weiss Essen players
Fortuna Düsseldorf II players
VfB Oldenburg players
2. Bundesliga players
3. Liga players
Regionalliga players